The Kahr MK Series is a series of pistols manufactured by Kahr Arms.

Variants
In 2003, Kahr Arms introduced Elite versions of the MK9 and MK40. The elite variants feature a polished stainless steel finish and a laser etching on the slide. In addition to an enhanced look, the magazine well is beveled to facilitate easier reloading, and the feed ramp is polished to insure reliable feeding.

References

External links 
 Official Website

Semi-automatic pistols of the United States
9mm Parabellum semi-automatic pistols
.40 S&W semi-automatic pistols